Lise may refer to:

People
Eliseo Nicolás Alonso (known as Lise; 1955–2012), Spanish woodcarver and sculptor
Claude Lise (born 1941), French politician from Martinique

Given name
Lise is a variant of the given name Lisa
Lise de Baissac, Mauritian secret agent of the Special Operations Executive in World War II
Lise Cabble, Danish singer and songwriter
Lise Lindstrom, American operatic soprano
Lise Magnier (born 1984), French politician
Lise Mayer (born 1959), American-born English television and film writer
Lise Meitner (1878–1968), Austrian-Swedish physicist
Lise Myhre (born 1975), Norwegian cartoonist
Lise Salvas-Bronsard (1940–1995), Canadian economist
Lise Thériault (born 1966), Canadian politician
Lise Thibault (born 1939), Canadian politician
Lise Tréhot (1848–1922) a French art model

Other uses
Lise, Široki Brijeg, a village in Široki Brijeg municipality, Bosnia and Herzegovina
Lise with a Parasol, an 1867 painting by Pierre-Auguste Renoir
The term for a secondary school in Turkey, derived from the French lycée; see Education in Turkey

See also

Liese (disambiguation)